Gaëtan Dussausaye (born 5 April 1994 in Brétigny-sur-Orge, Essonne) is a French politician.

From 2014 to 2018, he was the President of the National Front's youth wing, Front national de la jeunesse. He currently holds various positions within the party.

Biography 
Gaëtan Dussausaye grew up in Plessis-Pâté, with a mother who worked as a nurse, a father who was marketing director for a large French company, two brothers and one sister. His parents were not political and had never voted for the National Front.

He obtained a baccalauréat littéraire, graded 'Bien', in 2011. During his years at school, he ran a metal band, the Bursting Creepy. He started to become interested in politics after observing discrimination between the students at school.

He studied at the University of Paris I Pantheon-Sorbonne, where he obtained a bachelor's degree in philosophy and modern literature. After starting a master's degree in philosophy, he abandoned his studies after his accession to the presidency of the FNJ.

National Front 
After a brief involvement with a group dedicated to the memory of Charles de Gaulle, Dussausaye joined the National Front in 2011. His mother encouraged him to campaign in Paris, which was far away from his family's village. He began his political career as an activist during the 2012 presidential campaign of Marine Le Pen. He was successively Deputy Head of the FNJ in Paris and Departmental Secretary for Youth in Paris.

On October 8, 2014, Marine Le Pen named him President of the Front national de la jeunesse. He benefited from the support of Wallerand de Saint-Just, and succeeded Julien Rochedy, who "struggled to come to a consensus."

At the FN conference in November 2014, he joined the central committee (nominated by Marine Le Pen) and the political office. He is a permanent employee of the National Rally's Nanterre branch.

Since 2018, he has been the National Rally's co-representative for research and communications.

Campaigns 

 In 2014, he was a candidate in the municipal elections in the 11th arrondissement of Paris. and earned 5.5% of the vote
 In 2015, he was a candidate in the departmental elections in the canton of Brétigny-sur-Orge.
 In 2017, he was a candidate in the legislative elections in Oise's 2nd constituency.

Political beliefs 
Gaëtan Dussausaye is seen as an important figure in the de-demonisation of the National Rally. While he does not label himself as Gaullist, he is an admirer of Charles de Gaulle. He describes himself as a "patriot and souverainist". Although he is sometimes presented as being close with Florian Phillippot, Le Figaro places him within the party alongside "the non-aligned, because of their long-term commitment to the Front, their personal closeness with the FN's President, and the cautious neutrality they have observed in the recent conflicts."

In an interview soon after he became President of the FNJ, he was asked about the Great Replacement theory. In response he stated that he "does not see a replacement of people", but "above all a replacement of culture, at the base of Renaud Camus' theory there is a racialist foundation that we do not consider." This statement attracted many hostile responses from within the party.

Between 2014 and 2015, Dussausaye said that he was inspired by Aristotle, Rousseau, Spinoza, Boris Vian, Orwell and Marx – in regards to the latter he said: "not out of adhesion, but to have an argument against the left."

After the 2017 presidential election, he denied "without question" that the FN was in favour of leaving the eurozone.

References 

National Rally (France) politicians
Pantheon-Sorbonne University alumni
1994 births
Living people